was the son of Torii Mototada. He was lord of Yamura fief in Kai province (worth 35,000 koku), but was dispossessed in 1632 and banished to his nephew Torii Tadatsune's domain in Yamagata.

Daimyo
Year of death unknown
Year of birth unknown